Tropidozineus is a genus of beetles in the family Cerambycidae, containing the following species:

 Tropidozineus albidus Monne, 2009
 Tropidozineus amabilis Monné, 1991
 Tropidozineus argutulus Monné, 1988
 Tropidozineus cinctulus Monné & Martins, 1976
 Tropidozineus complanatus Monné, 1991
 Tropidozineus fulveolus (Lameere, 1884)
 Tropidozineus ignobilis (Bates, 1863)
 Tropidozineus impensus Monné & Martins, 1976
 Tropidozineus inexpectatus (Melzer, 1934)
 Tropidozineus martinsi Monne, 2009
 Tropidozineus pauper (Melzer, 1931)
 Tropidozineus quadricristatus (Melzer, 1935)
 Tropidozineus rotundicollis (Bates, 1863)
 Tropidozineus sincerus Monné, 1988
 Tropidozineus tersus (Melzer, 1931)
 Tropidozineus tuberosus Monné, 1991
 Tropidozineus vicinus (Melzer, 1931)

References

 
Acanthocinini